In the years running up to the 2013 Italian general election, various organisations carried out opinion polls to gauge voting intention in Italy. Results of such polls are given in this article. The date range for these opinion polls is from January 2012. In late 2012, outgoing Prime Minister Mario Monti declared his intention to support a centrist coalition named With Monti for Italy; opinion polls conducted before December 2012 do not consider this. Poll results are reported at the dates when the fieldwork was done, as opposed to the date of publication; if such date is unknown, the date of publication is given instead. Under the Italian par condicio (equal conditions) law, publication of opinion polls is forbidden in the last two weeks of an electoral campaign.

Party vote

Graphical summary 
Poll results in this section use the date of publication of the survey. Detailed data are usually published in the official website of the Italian government. The publication of opinion polls during the last 15 days of the electoral campaign is forbidden by Italian law.

2013

2012

2011

2010

2009

2008

Coalition vote

Graphical summary

2013 
The following table gathers the results of coalitions into one column, providing insight into the post-election balance of power.

References 

Opinion polling in Italy
2013 elections in Italy
Italy 2013